Bareuther is a surname. Notable people with the surname include:

Ernst Bareuther (1838–1905), Bohemian-Austrian politician
Herbert Bareuther (1914–1945), German World War II flying ace

See also
 Bayreuther (disambiguation)

Surnames of German origin